Meng Guofen is a Chinese Paralympic swimmer with cerebral palsy. She represented China at the 2016 Summer Paralympics held in Rio de Janeiro, Brazil and she won the silver medal in the women's 50 metre backstroke S3 event.

References

External links 
 

Living people
Year of birth missing (living people)
Place of birth missing (living people)
Chinese female backstroke swimmers
Swimmers at the 2016 Summer Paralympics
Medalists at the 2016 Summer Paralympics
Paralympic silver medalists for China
Paralympic medalists in swimming
S3-classified Paralympic swimmers
Sportspeople with cerebral palsy
21st-century Chinese women